Lungi is a coastal town in Port Loko District in the Northern Province of Sierra Leone.

Lungi is best known for being home to the  Lungi International Airport, the international airport that serves Sierra Leone. The sea separates Lungi from Sierra Leone's  capital Freetown. Some of the most luxurious hotels and restaurants in Sierra Leone are based in Lungi.

There are frequent commercial helicopter, hovercraft, buses and ferry-service to Freetown and other parts of Sierra Leone from Lungi.

History
Dala Modu Dumbuya, a Susu trader from Wonkafong, Sumbuya settled here in 1806 after being based in Freetown for over ten years. However he was accused of slave trading. The town was previously called Madina, but that name is now used for Madina, Port Loko District, a small settlement to the south. Under Dala Modu the location became an important trading centre between Freetown and the rivers further north. It was also the major Muslim centre along this stretch of coast.

References

Populated places in Sierra Leone
Northern Province, Sierra Leone